Daniel James Parkinson is an English footballer who plays as a midfielder. He played in the Football League for Morecambe.

Playing career
Parkinson came through the Morecambe youth academy to sign a one-year contract for the 2011–12 season. He made his first team debut as an 89th-minute substitute for Kevin Ellison in a 2–0 win over Aldershot Town at the Globe Arena on 20 August 2011. Three days later he was again a late replacement for Ellison in a 2–0 defeat to Millwall in a League Cup Second Round clash at The Den.

Parkinson was released by Morecambe at the end of the 2012–13 season. He subsequently signed for Barrow of the Conference North.

References

External links

Profile at the official Morecambe site

1992 births
Living people
English footballers
Association football midfielders
Morecambe F.C. players
Colwyn Bay F.C. players
Barrow A.F.C. players
Vauxhall Motors F.C. players
English Football League players